Hargelle is a district of Somali Region in Ethiopia.

Hargelle is one of the woredas in the Somali Region of Ethiopia.

 hargelle

References 

Districts of Somali Region